The Columbus Open, also known as the Buckeye Tennis Championships or Buckeye Open, is a defunct affiliated men's tennis tournament played from 1970 to 1984 in Columbus, Ohio in the United States. The inaugural edition in 1970 was an invitational tournament with eight top independent professional players. It was played on synthetic hard court at the newly created 3,200-seat stadium at the Buckeye Boys Ranch in Grove City, a suburb of Columbus. From 1971 until 1984 the tournament was part of the Grand Prix circuit. The tournament was played on outdoor clay courts from 1971 to 1979, and then played on outdoor hard courts from 1980 to 1984.

Brian Teacher was the most successful player at the tournament, winning the singles competition twice and the doubles competition three times with three different partners; once with American William Brown, once with American Bruce Manson and once with American Scott Davis.

Finals

Singles

Doubles

See also
 Virginia Slims of Columbus – women's tournament
 Columbus Challenger – men's challenger tournament

Notes

References

External links
 ATP results archive

Hard court tennis tournaments in the United States
Clay court tennis tournaments
Defunct tennis tournaments in the United States
Grand Prix tennis circuit